The flag of the patujú flower is a flag used in official acts of the Bolivia government, which shows Bolivia's national flower. The latter represents the indigenous peoples of Eastern Bolivia and has been used as a symbol of protest by the opponents of Evo Morales in that area of the country.

History 

With the demonstrations against the construction of a road in Indigenous Land and Isiboro-Secure National Park (TIPNIS) in 2011 and 2012 came the idea of representing eastern Bolivia with the flower of patujú, and the flag was present in these demonstrations. However, it did not have official representation in public events at national level, not even an exclusive design. However, in 2013, it started to be used in the Santa Cruz Department, in 2014 in the Beni Department and in 2018 in the La Paz Department.

During the government of Jeanine Áñez the flag was used next to the two flags of state institutions in Palacio Quemado and those in official acts with a new and exclusive design.

See also 
 2019 Bolivian political crisis
 Wiphala

References 

National symbols of Bolivia
Flags of Bolivia
Native American flags
Santa Cruz Department (Bolivia)
Beni Department
Patujú flower